Jeziory may refer to the following places

Poland
Jeziory, Greater Poland Voivodeship (west-central Poland)
Jeziory, Lower Silesian Voivodeship (south-west Poland)
Jeziory, Lublin Voivodeship (east Poland)
Jeziory, Lubusz Voivodeship (west Poland)
Jeziory, Masovian Voivodeship (east-central Poland)
Jeziory, Świętokrzyskie Voivodeship (south-central Poland)

Ukraine
Velyki Ozera, known in Polish as Jeziory (north-west Ukraine)